Mária Korenčiová (born 27 April 1989) is a Slovak professional footballer who plays as a goalkeeper for Italian Serie A club Como and the Slovakia women's national team.

Club career
Korenčiová started her career in 2005 Slovan Bratislava, where she played for 8 years. Also in 2005 she made her debut in the UEFA Women's Champions League with Slovan and first played with the Slovak U-19 national team. She made her debut for the senior national team on November 23, 2006 in the 2009 EURO qualifiers' preliminary round, and since the 2011 World Cup qualifiers she has been its first-choice goalkeeper.

In the 2012–13 winter break she moved to Slavia Prague in the Czech league, and following the end of the season she signed for SC Sand of the 2nd Bundesliga, Germany's second tier. Sand was promoted to the first division for the 2014–15 season.

In July 2016, Korenčiová moved to Swiss Nationalliga A side FC Neunkirch.

In July 2018, Korenčiová joined Italian club AC Milan.

In 2020, Korenčiová was named the best Slovak player of the year.

In January 2022, after 3.5 years at Milan, Korenčiová left the club to join Spanish club Levante, signing until the end of the 2021–22 Primera División season. She returned to Italy with Como in July 2022.

References

External links
 

1989 births
Living people
Slovak women's footballers
ŠK Slovan Bratislava (women) players
SK Slavia Praha (women) players
SC Sand players
FC Neunkirch players
Slovak expatriate footballers
Expatriate women's footballers in the Czech Republic
Expatriate women's footballers in Germany
Expatriate women's footballers in Switzerland
Expatriate women's footballers in Italy
Slovak expatriate sportspeople in the Czech Republic
Slovak expatriate sportspeople in Germany
Slovak expatriate sportspeople in Switzerland
Slovakia women's international footballers
Women's association football goalkeepers
A.C. Milan Women players
Levante UD Femenino players
SC Freiburg (women) players
Footballers from Bratislava
Czech Women's First League players
FIFA Century Club
S.S.D. F.C. Como Women players